AS 1100 is an Australian Standard for technical drawing including both mechanical and architectural designs. AS 1100 standard drawings contain attributes that are universal around Australia. The standard is published by Standards Australia.

The standard consists of five parts,
Part 101: General principles (1992)
Part 201: Mechanical engineering drawing (1992)
Part 301: Architectural drawing (2008)
Part 401: Engineering survey and engineering survey design drawing (1984)
Part 501: Structural engineering drawing (2002)

References

Building engineering
Architectural communication
Standards of Australia